TestLodge is a cloud-based test management tool which enables software testers and QA teams to manage their test cases and document their testing efforts. The software is developed by TestLodge Limited, which is based in Cardiff, United Kingdom.

Testlodge was launched in 2013 in Penarth, Wales by Scott Sherwood and bootstrapped. In 2017 the company was selected as one of the three winners for Best Global Reach by WalesOnline Digital Awards. In the same year it launched a career support platform.

References

Cloud applications
Software testing tools